Anna Martina Granström (born 5 August 1991 in Uppsala, Sweden) is a Swedish swimmer who competes in the Women's butterfly. At the 2012 Summer Olympics she finished 14th overall in the heats in the Women's 100 metre butterfly and qualified for the semifinal. She also competed in the Women's 200 metre butterfly and the 4 x 100 m medley relay team.

References

External links
Official website

1991 births
Sportspeople from Uppsala
Living people
Olympic swimmers of Sweden
Swimmers at the 2012 Summer Olympics
European Aquatics Championships medalists in swimming
Jönköpings SS swimmers
Swedish female butterfly swimmers
20th-century Swedish women
21st-century Swedish women